WMSO (1240 AM) is an Urban adult contemporary and Gospel format broadcast radio station licensed to Southaven, Mississippi, serving Metro Memphis. WMSO is owned and operated by Flinn Broadcasting.

History
On May 13, 2019, WMSO changed their format from southern gospel to urban oldies, branded as "Memphis Soul 104.1".

On June 8, 2020, WMSO changed their format from urban oldies to classic hip hop, branded as "Bumpin 104.1".

FM translator
WMSO programming is relayed to an FM translator, which gives the listener the choice of FM with higher quality stereophonic sound. The translator is owned by Arlington Broadcasting Company.

Previous logos

References

External links

MSO
Radio stations established in 1990
1990 establishments in Mississippi
Urban adult contemporary radio stations in the United States
Gospel radio stations in the United States